Uuslinn (Estonian for "New Town") is a subdistrict in the district of Lasnamäe, Tallinn, the capital of Estonia. It has a population of 353.

The headquarters of Estonian Maritime Administration is located at Valge 4 in Uuslinn.

References

Subdistricts of Tallinn